Andrée Belle (?–?) was a French painter.

Andrée Belle was born in Paris.
She was a pupil of Jean-Charles Cazin (1840–1901). She painted in oils and pastels, landscapes especially, of which she exhibited seventeen in June, 1902. The larger part of these were landscape portraits. The subjects were well represented, and the various hours of day, with characteristic lighting, unusually well rendered. At the Salon des Beaux Arts, 1902, this artist exhibited a large pastel, "A Halt at St. Mammes" and a "Souvenir of Bormes", showing the tomb of Cazin. In 1903, she exhibited a pastel called "Calvary," which became part of the collection of the Musée de Picardie at Amiens; it was praised for its harmony of color and the manner in which the rainbow is represented. Her pictures of "Twilight" and "Sunset " are unusually successful. She was a member of the Société Nationale des Beaux-Arts.

References

Painters from Paris
French women painters
20th-century French painters
20th-century French women artists
Year of birth missing
Year of death missing